Aramus is the sole extant genus of the family Aramidae. The limpkin (Aramus guarauna) is the only living member of this group, although other species are known from the fossil record, such as Aramus paludigrus from the Middle Miocene.

References

Bird genera
Bird genera with one living species
Taxa named by Louis Jean Pierre Vieillot
Gruiformes
Extant Miocene first appearances